The Arcfox α-S is an all-electric executive car manufactured by BAIC under the Arcfox brand.

Overview 

In the second half of January 2021, the Chinese automobile division Arcfox presented a new large electric crossover, which, like the smaller α-T model, was called α-S and was kept in a similar stylistic formula.

The car got aggressively styled headlights, an imitation of the air intake in the shape of a trapezoid, and a pointed front apron. In addition, the vehicle has a gently sloping roof line, as well as retractable door handles and rear lamps connected by a luminous strip.

In terms of the available variants of the battery, the manufacturer has provided three variants that will allow the vehicle to drive  on a single charge according to the Chinese NEDC measurement procedure.

Electronics for the Arcfox α-S are co-developed with Huawei.

In July 2021, an Arcfox Alpha-S was crash-tested in China (car-to-car crash test) versus a BYD Han EV with blade batteries. The result is that the Alpha-S is safer. At about 48 hours after the test, nothing happened to the Arcfox Alpha-S, only the BYD Han car caught fire and burned to the ground.

References 

Arcfox vehicles
Cars introduced in 2020
Executive cars
Front-wheel-drive vehicles
All-wheel-drive vehicles
Production electric cars
Vehicles codeveloped with Huawei